Dona Barakat is a Lebanese diplomat currently serving as Lebanon ambassador to Hellenic Republic. She was deployed to the country after four years without Lebanese ambassador in the country.

References 

Ambassadors of Lebanon to Greece
Living people
Year of birth missing (living people)
Lebanese women ambassadors